The Institute of Bangladesh Studies (IBS) is a research centre in the University of Rajshahi, Bangladesh. and is a school for inter-disciplinary study and research on various aspects of Bangladeshi society and culture.

History 
Institute of Bangladesh Studies was established in 1974. It was created under the Rajshahi University Act 1973.

References

Educational institutions established in 1973
1974 establishments in Bangladesh
Research institutes in Bangladesh
Organisations based in Rajshahi
University of Rajshahi